Lewis Van Bergen (November 9, 1938 – April 6, 2018) was an American actor, best known for his role as Jon Sable on the short-lived 1987 television series Sable.

He was in the film Bugsy in the role of Joey Adonis, with whom Bugsy Siegel competed for the affection of Virginia Hill.

Death
Van Bergen died on April 6, 2018 at the age of 79. His cause of death is unknown.

Filmography

Film

References

External links 
 

1938 births
2018 deaths
American male film actors
American male television actors
20th-century American male actors
Male actors from New York City